The Ivchenko-Progress AI-222 is a family of low-bypass turbofan engines.

Design and development
The development of the engine started at Ivchenko-Progress of Zaporizhzhia, Ukraine in 1999. The engine was originally intended for the Yakovlev Yak-130 trainer aircraft. An afterburning version, the AI-222-25F (from Russian/Ukrainian "Форсаж", meaning reheat) is also available with thrust vectoring.

In 2015 Russian manufacturer "Saljut" began to produce AI-222-25 without any Ukrainian involvement.

Variants
AI-222-25
AI-222-25F
AI-222-25KVT
AI-222-25KFK
AI-222-28
AI-222-28F

Applications
 Hongdu JL-10 (L-15)
 Yakovlev Yak-130

Specifications (AI-222-25)

See also

References

Low-bypass turbofan engines
AI-222
2000s turbofan engines